Zygaspis quadrifrons,  also known as the Kalahari dwarf worm lizard or Kalahari round-snouted worm lizard, is a worm lizard species in the family Amphisbaenidae. It is found in southern Africa.

References

Zygaspis
Reptiles described in 1862
Taxa named by Wilhelm Peters